is a private university in Nagasaki, Nagasaki, Japan, established in 1950. Junshin means "Immaculate Heart of Mary" in English. The school is one of the most important Catholic schools in Japan .

See also 
Bernard Ryosuke Inagaki, professor of humanities

References

External links
 Official website 

Educational institutions established in 1998
Private universities and colleges in Japan
Universities and colleges in Nagasaki Prefecture
1998 establishments in Japan
Catholic universities and colleges in Japan